The several branches of the Armed Forces of Ukraine are represented by flags, among other emblems and insignia. Within each branch, various flags fly on various occasions, and on various ships, bases, camps, and military academies.

Flags

Maritime flags
Many maritime flags have been used in Ukraine.

Personal flags

Military of Ukraine
Ukraine
Ukrainian military-related lists